Con Foley (born 19 September 1992) is a professional rugby union player. He is currently signed to the New Orleans Gold team in the United States and previously played for Australian sides North Harbour and Brisbane City. His usual position is centre or on the wing. Foley has represented Australia in rugby sevens.

Early life and career
Born in Brisbane, Foley attended St. Joseph's College, Gregory Terrace before playing his senior club rugby for the University of Queensland Rugby Club.

Rugby 7s
He played at the 2013 Rugby Sevens World Cup, where he scored two tries, and at 2014 Commonwealth Games. Foley represented his country at the 2016 Summer Olympics. After five full seasons on the World Sevens Series circuit he decided to return to fifteen-a-side rugby, however he did gain a recall to the national sevens team for the Hong Kong tournament in 2018.

Rugby 15s
In 2012, Foley was selected for the  team and toured to South Africa where he played in the Junior World Championship. He focused his career on rugby sevens thereafter until late 2016 when he signed with North Harbour to play in Australia's National Rugby Championship (NRC). Foley joined Sydney club Northern Suburbs for the Shute Shield competition in 2017 before returning home to captain University of Queensland for the 2018 Queensland Premier Rugby season. He played NRC with  later that year, and signed for the New Orleans Gold ahead of the 2019 Major League Rugby season in the United States.

Honours
 Shawn Mackay Award 2013 – Australian Sevens Player of the Year

References

External links
 Statistics on Its Rugby
 

1992 births
Living people
Australia international rugby sevens players
Australian expatriate rugby union players
Australian expatriate sportspeople in the United States
Commonwealth Games bronze medallists for Australia
Commonwealth Games medallists in rugby sevens
Expatriate rugby union players in the United States
Commonwealth Games rugby sevens players of Australia
Male rugby sevens players
New Orleans Gold players
Olympic rugby sevens players of Australia
Rugby sevens players at the 2014 Commonwealth Games
Rugby sevens players at the 2016 Summer Olympics
Rugby union players from Brisbane
Medallists at the 2014 Commonwealth Games